James Egan Moulton (4 January 1841 – 9 May 1909) was an English-born Australian Methodist minister and headmaster and school president.

Early life

Moulton was born in North Shields, Northumberland. Many members of his family were Methodist ministers and he attended the Wesleyan school Kingswood in Bath.  In 1863 he was the founding headmaster of Newington College while awaiting a posting to Tonga.  Before leaving, he married Emma Knight and they had three sons and three daughters together.

Tongan ministry
In Tonga he presided over the Methodist church and established Tupou College, patronised by King George Tupou I.  During his time in Tonga, a schism formed within the church leading to the creation of the Free Church of Tonga.  Throughout the dispute, Moulton managed to stay on good terms with the new movement.  He translated several texts into Tongan, including Milton's Paradise Lost.

Australian ministry
Moulton returned to Sydney in 1893 and took up the presidency of Newington College.  In 1895, Moulton was the inaugural President of the Old Newingtonians' Union. During this time, he completed translating the Bible into Tongan, which is still in use today in Tonga. In 1896 the first Tongan students arrived at Newington. They appear in admission records with anglicised names as Moulton Finau, Saul Funaki, Tonga Latu, Charles Liu, John Otuhoume, Egan Tatafu and Tugi William Tuboulaki. The initial seven arrived at the beginning of the school year with Solo Ula arriving some time between April and June of that year.

Death
Moulton died, aged sixty-eight, in Lindfield and is buried in Gore Hill cemetery.

See also
 John Fletcher Moulton, brother
 Richard Green Moulton,  brother
 William Fiddian Moulton, brother
 James Hope Moulton, nephew
 John Egan Moulton, great grandson
 Bible translations into Oceanic languages

References

External links
 
 S. G. Claughton, 'Moulton, James Egan (1841 - 1909)', Australian Dictionary of Biography, Volume 5, MUP, 1974, pp 305–306.

Bibliography
 D. S. Macmillan, Newington College 1863-1963 (Syd, 1963)
 P. L. Swain, Newington Across the Years 1863-1998 (Syd, 1999)

1841 births
1909 deaths
Australian Methodist ministers
Australian headmasters
Methodist theologians
James Egan
English theologians
Translators of the Bible into Polynesian languages
Staff of Newington College
People educated at Kingswood School, Bath
Old Newingtonians' Union presidents
19th-century Methodist ministers
20th-century Methodist ministers
People from North Shields
Australian expatriates in Tonga
Burials at Gore Hill Cemetery
Protestant ministers and clergy in Australia